Cirsonella kerguelenensis is a species of sea snail, a marine gastropod mollusk in the family Skeneidae.

Description
The height of the shell attains 2.3 mm.

Distribution
This species occurs off the Kerguelen Islands, Southern Indian Ocean and off Argentina at a depth of 600 m.

References

 Thiele, J. 1912. Die antarktischen Schnecken und Muscheln. Deutsche Südpolar-Expedition 1901-1903 13: 183-286, pls. 11-19 Georg Reimer: Berlin.

External links
 To Encyclopedia of Life
 To World Register of Marine Species

kerguelenensis
Gastropods described in 1912